Parkman Township is one of the sixteen townships of Geauga County, Ohio, United States. As of the 2020 census the population was 4,446, up from 4,136 at the previous census.

According to the 2020 "ACS 5-Year Estimates Data Profiles", 37.4% of the township's population spoke only English, while 62.6 spoke an "other [than Spanish] Indo-European language" (basically Pennsylvania German/German).

History
Named for Samuel Parkman, an agent with the Connecticut Land Company, it is the only Parkman Township statewide.

Geography
Located in the southeastern corner of the county, it borders the following townships:
Middlefield Township - north
Mesopotamia Township, Trumbull County - northeast corner
Farmington Township, Trumbull County - east
Southington Township, Trumbull County - southeast corner
Nelson Township, Portage County - south
Hiram Township, Portage County - southwest corner
Troy Township - west
Burton Township - northwest corner

No municipalities are located in Parkman Township, although the unincorporated community of Parkman lies in the southern part of the township.

Demographics

Government
The township is governed by a three-member board of trustees, who are elected in November of odd-numbered years to a four-year term beginning on the following January 1. Two are elected in the year after the presidential election and one is elected in the year before it. There is also an elected township fiscal officer, who serves a four-year term beginning on April 1 of the year after the election, which is held in November of the year before the presidential election. Vacancies in the fiscal officership or on the board of trustees are filled by the remaining trustees.

Notable people
Brian Barthelmes, 2001 Kenston High School graduate, University of Virginia football star and former member of New England Patriots practice squad

References

External links
Community website
County website

Townships in Geauga County, Ohio
Townships in Ohio